Tai Chen-yao (2 April 1948 – 19 November 2017) was a Taiwanese politician. He served three terms in the Legislative Yuan, from 1990 to 1996 and again from 1999 to 2002, and was later named vice chairman of the Council of Agriculture.

Education
Tai attended schools in his native Kaohsiung and later studied at the University of San Diego. Taiwanese Hokkien was his first language.

Career
Prior to serving on the legislature, Tai was a farmer's rights activist and was imprisoned for three years for his actions during the Kaohsiung Incident in 1979. He was elected to the Legislative Yuan for the first time in 1989, representing the functional constituency for farmers. During that election cycle, Tai became the first candidate in 40 years to win election from the agricultural constituency without the support of the Kuomintang. In April 1992, Tai was injured in a physical altercation on the floor of the Legislative Yuan, which required hospitalization. In the December 1992 legislative elections, Tai retained his legislative seat as an at-large candidate on the party list of the Democratic Progressive Party. The DPP's New Tide faction supported his campaign for a second consecutive term. Tai served his third and final term on the Legislative Yuan from 1999 to 2002. By March 2003, Tai was vice chairman of the Council of Agriculture. In his COA position, Tai discussed conservation initiatives related to the black-faced spoonbill, the price of the 2003 rice crop, the rescue of stray dolphins in Tamsui River, and promoted Arbor Month and honey made from longan. Tai was formally sworn in as COA vice chairman in June 2004, after which he inspected damage from Typhoon Mindulle alongside premier Yu Shyi-kun. Upon learning that Formosan rock macaques were damaging crops, Tai stated in October 2004 that the Council of Agriculture would establish a task force to confront the issue. In April 2005, Tai cautioned Taiwanese farmers against exporting to China, as a formal agreement on tariffs had not yet been signed. Soon after the 2005 Pan-Blue visits to mainland China, Tai announced in June 2005 that the Council of Agriculture would be negotiating an agreement for the import of Taiwan-grown fruits to China.

Tai was awarded the Order of Brilliant Star in 2017, and died of pancreatic cancer on 19 November of that year, aged 69.

References

1948 births
2017 deaths
Democratic Progressive Party Members of the Legislative Yuan
Members of the 1st Legislative Yuan in Taiwan
Members of the 2nd Legislative Yuan
Members of the 4th Legislative Yuan
University of San Diego alumni
Party List Members of the Legislative Yuan
Politicians of the Republic of China on Taiwan from Kaohsiung
Taiwanese prisoners and detainees
Prisoners and detainees of Taiwan
Deaths from pancreatic cancer
Deaths from cancer in Taiwan
Recipients of the Order of Brilliant Star
Government ministers of Taiwan
Taiwanese activists
Farmers' rights activists